Terje Larsen may refer to:

 Terje Larsen, known as The Wanderer (criminal) (1958–2018), Norwegian serial burglar
 Terje Larsen (tennis) (born 1951), Swedish tennis player
 Terje Rød-Larsen (born 1947), Norwegian diplomat
 Terje Holtet Larsen (born 1963), Norwegian journalist and novelist